The seventh season of the animated comedy series Bob's Burgers began airing on Fox in the United States on September 25, 2016, and concluded on June 11, 2017. The season contained 22 episodes.

On October 7, 2015, the series was renewed for a seventh production cycle, which premiered during the seventh broadcast season.

Episodes

References

External links
 Official website
 
 

2016 American television seasons
2017 American television seasons
Bob's Burgers seasons
Bob's Burgers (season 7) episodes